The Ringelspitz (also known as Piz Barghis) is a mountain of the Glarus Alps, located on the border between the Swiss cantons of St. Gallen and Graubünden. Reaching a height of 3,248 metres above sea level, it is the highest summit in the canton of St. Gallen. It is split between three municipalities: Pfäfers (St. Gallen), Trin and Tamins (Graubünden).

The Ringelspitz is the culminating point of a range, about 12 kilometres long, running from west to east and diverging from the main chain of the Glarus Alp between Piz Sardona and Piz Segnas. The massif separates the Calfeisen valley in canton St. Gallen from the Rhine valley near Flims. The north side of the mountain consists of nearly 2,000 metre-high precipitous cliffs overlooking the Gigerwaldsee (1,335 m).

See also
List of mountains of the canton of St. Gallen
List of mountains of Switzerland
List of most isolated mountains of Switzerland

References

External links 
 
 Ringelspitz on Summitpost
 Ringelspitz on Hikr

Mountains of the Alps
Alpine three-thousanders
Mountains of Switzerland
Highest points of Swiss cantons
Glarus thrust
Mountains of the canton of St. Gallen
Mountains of Graubünden
Graubünden–St. Gallen border
Tamins
Trin